Cefotiam is a parenteral third-generation cephalosporin antibiotic. It has broad-spectrum activity against Gram-positive and Gram-negative bacteria. As a beta-lactam, its bactericidal activity results from the inhibition of cell wall synthesis via affinity for penicillin-binding proteins.

It was patented in 1973 and approved for medical use in 1981.

Medical uses
This drug is indicated for prophylaxis for surgical infection, postoperative infections, bacterial septicaemia, bone and joint infections, cholangitis, cholecystitis, peritonitis, prostatitis, pyelonephritis, respiratory tract infections, skin and soft tissue infections, cystitis, urethritis, and infections caused by susceptible organisms. It does not have activity against Pseudomonas aeruginosa.

Dosage
For adults, the dose is up to 6 grams daily by intravenous or intramuscular route in divided doses according to severity of infection. In patients with renal impairment a dose reduction may be needed.

Spectrum of bacterial susceptibility
Cefotiam has a broad spectrum of activity and has been used to treat infections caused by a number of enteric bacteria and bacteria responsible for causing skin infections. The following represents MIC susceptibility data for a few medically significant bacteria.
 Bacteroides fragilis: - 16 - >128 μg/ml
 Clostridium difficile: >128 μg/ml
 Staphylococcus aureus: 0.25 - 32 μg/ml

Adverse effects
Side effects include nausea and vomiting, diarrhoea, hypersensitivity reactions, nephrotoxicity, convulsions, CNS toxicity, hepatic dysfunction, haematologic disorders, pain at injection site, thrombophlebitis, pseudomembranous colitis, and superinfection with prolonged use.

Mechanism of action
Cefotiam inhibits final cross-linking stage of peptidoglycan production, thus inhibiting bacterial cell wall synthesis. It has similar or less activity against Gram-positive staphylococci and streptococci, but is resistant to some beta-lactamases produced by Gram-negative bacteria. It is more active against many of the Enterobacteriaceae including Enterobacter, E. coli, Klebsiella, Salmonella and indole-positive Proteus species.

In clinical use, high concentrations of cefotiam are observed in several tissues (kidney, heart, ear, prostate, and genital tract), as well as in fluids and secretions (bile, ascitic fluid).

References

Further reading
 
 
 

Thiazoles
Tetrazoles
Cephalosporin antibiotics
Dimethylamino compounds
Amino acids